Kabut Sutra Ungu (literally Mist of Purple Silk) is a 1979 Indonesian film directed by Sjumandjaja and starring Jenny Rachman, Roy Marten, and El Manik. Adopted from the novel of the same name by Ike Soepomo, it follows a young widow who must overcome various obstacles before marrying again.

Plot
Miranti (Jenny Rachman) is left a widow after her pilot husband dies in an accident. She forces herself to work independently, despite feeling alienated. She soon learns that her brother-in-law Dimas (Roy Marten) cares greatly for her. Miranti ultimately realises that his feelings are more than just pity, and the two can unite.

Production
Kabut Sutra Ungu was produced and directed by Sjumandjaja.  It was his first film in over a year, following Yang Muda Yang Bercinta (The Young Fall in Love; 1978); the film's extended issues with the Indonesian censorship bureau, as well as his own poor health, had led Sjumandjaja to take a hiatus.

Sjumandjaja adapted the screenplay from the novel of the same name by Ike Soepomo, who had recently made her debut. Although he had previously heard his friends praise the novel, he first read it when an attendant on a train offered him a selection of books as reading material. Ultimately Sjumandjaja put a planned film on the Wali Songo on hold and began an adaptation. Production began in October 1979.

The film, made for Matari Artis Jaya Film, saw Leo Fioole on camera and Berthy I Lindia as artistic director. In post-production Sudharnoto handled music while Suparman Sidik did sound. The film was edited by Janis Badar.

The film starred Jenny Rachman and Roy Marten, with other roles handled by actors including El Manik, Sys NS, Ami Priyono, Farouk Afero, and Chitra Dewi. Rachman, then rising in popularity, refused several offers so that she could take a role in Kabut Sutra Ungu.

Release and reception
Kabut Sutra Ungu was released in 1979. It proved the year's most popular Indonesian film, seeing almost half a million viewers in Jakarta. A review in Berita Yudha found the film to be well done, despite having extensive dialogue and Westernised symbolism. The reviewer considered the film to express the concerns faced by widows in Indonesia at the time.

Awards
Kabut Sutra Ungu was nominated for seven Citra Awards at the 1980 Indonesian Film Festival, winning four; the festival also gave the film a special award as for showing a psychological change in society. Two of the awards it lost – Best Director and Best Screenplay – went to Frank Rorimpandey's Perawan Desa, while Best Supporting Actor went to Hassan Sanusi of Rembulan dan Matahari. Kabut Sutra Ungu also received an award for Best Actress at that year's Asia Pacific Film Festival. In 1981 it won the Antemas Award for being the best-selling film of the preceding year.

Footnotes

Works cited

External links

Citra Award winners
Films directed by Sjumandjaja
Films based on Indonesian novels
Indonesian drama films